The following is a list of chronological attacks attributed to the LTTE in 1980s during the Sri Lankan Civil War. The deadliest single attack for the decade was the Anuradhapura massacre in 1985.

Attacks in chronological order

1983

1984
1984 marked the intensification of the war between the Tamil separatists and the Sri Lankan government, as well as the first reports of civilian massacres by the LTTE.

{| class="wikitable" style="width:100%;"
|-
! width="10%" | Date !! width="40%" | Attack !! width="25%" | Location !! width="5%"| Sinhalese !! width="5%"| Tamils !! width="5%"| Muslims !! width="5%" | Death toll !! width="5%" | Sources
|-
| November 11 || Dollar Farm massacre: 33 civilians which included women and children were attacked in Dollar Farm village in the night by an armed group made up of LTTE cadres.||Mullaitivu District||33|| || ||33||
|-
| November 30 || Kent Farm massacre: Following the attack on the Dollar Farm village, a second night raid was launched by the LTTE cadres which targeted the Kent Farm village, 29 civilians including women and children were massacred. They also looted and set fire on to victims houses.||Mullaitivu District||29|| || ||29||
|-
| December 1 || Kokilai massacre: LTTE cadres kill eleven Sinhalese civilians in the fishing village of Kokilai.||Kokkilai, Mullaitivu District ||11|| || ||11||
|-
| December 31 || LTTE members kill 4 Tamil civilians and dump them outside of Batticaloa for refusing to fight for the group. Altogether 30 Tamil civilians were killed for similar reasons in 1984.||Batticaloa, Batticaloa District || ||30 || ||30||
|}

1985
1985 marked a major escalation of hostilities. For the first time the LTTE attacked a major Sinhalese majority town killing 146 unarmed civilians. The impact of this attack was felt across the island and received worldwide attention.

1986

1987

1988March 2: Morawewa, Trincomalee: LTTE cadres shot dead 14 Sinhalese villagers.March 11: Suhadagama Horowpathana Anuradhapura: A group of LTTE cadres attacked a private bus, 22 Sri 2218, at Suhadagamaw with small arms and grenades, killing 19 passengers and injuring nine others.March 14: Galmitiyawa, Kantalai: LTTE cadres shot dead 13 Sinhalese villagers at Galmitiyawa.March 15: Kivulkade, Morawewa, Trincomalee: Two groups of LTTE operatives entered the village and killed seven Sinhalese villagers.March 17: Deegavapiya, Damana, Ampara: LTTE cadres hacked to death 13 Sinhalese villagers.March 22: Pudukulam, Vavuniya: Between ten and 15 LTTE cadres attacked the Sinhalese village and killed six villagers. Another three were injured.March 22: Medavachchi-kulam Vavuniya: LTTE cadres shot dead nine Sinhalese villagers.March 29: Wewalketiya: A LTTE bomb exploded inside CTB bus 29 Sri 9037 Anuradhapura which was proceeding from Horowpathana to Medavachchiya, killing nine passengers and injuring 14 others.March 31: Saindamaradu, Kalmunai: LTTE cadres attacked the village, killing ten Muslims and seven Tamils.April 8: Horowpathana, Meegaswewa, Anuradhapura: LTTE gunmen killed 14 Sinhalese.May 1: Sittaru Kantalai, Trincomalee: LTTE cadres exploded a land-mine on a CTB bus killing twelve Sinhalese, nine Muslims and five others, who were not identified.July 28: Ethawetunawewa, Weli Oya: LTTE operatives hacked to death 16 Sinhalese villagers.August 16: Trincomalee (opposite Clock Tower): LTTE cadres exploded a bomb, killing sixe Sinhalese, two Muslims, one Tamil and a soldier; 19 persons sustained injuries.August 25: Marawila, Polonnaruwa: LTTE cadres killed eleven civilians by cutting their necks.September 10: 16th Colony, Central Camp Ampara: LTTE cadres shot dead seven Sinhalese and four Tamils.October 9''': Mahakongaskada Medavachchiya: LTTuding two security force personnel.

1989

See also
 List of (non-state) terrorist incidents

References

LTTE, 1980s
LTTE, 1980s
LTTE attacks, 1980s
1980s
Sri 
Terrorist incidents in Sri Lanka in the 1980s